Keith McIntosh (6 September 1928 – 31 July 2015) was an Australian rules footballer who played with Essendon in the Victorian Football League (VFL). He won reserves premierships with Essendon in 1950 and 1952.

Notes

External links 		
		

Essendon Football Club past player profile
	

1928 births
2015 deaths
Australian rules footballers from Victoria (Australia)
Essendon Football Club players
Doutta Stars Football Club players